The 1977 Nebraska Cornhuskers football team represented the University of Nebraska–Lincoln in the 1977 NCAA Division I football season. The team was coached by Tom Osborne and played their home games in Memorial Stadium in Lincoln, Nebraska.

Schedule

Roster

Depth chart

Coaching staff

Game summaries

Washington State

Nebraska convincingly dominated Washington State on the field and statistically, but fumbled repeatedly, including three times inside the Cougar 10-yard line and once on a punt.  Despite the miscues, Nebraska still held onto a 7–7 tie at halftime.  As the game progressed and Washington State began to pull away, Nebraska kept piling up the statistics but failed to get any closer than 10-14 before the Cougars iced the game with a field goal and a safety in the 4th quarter.  The numbers defied the scoreboard, as Nebraska led in first downs 24–14, on the ground 247-120 and in the air 223–174, but the number that mattered was 0–1 to start the season.

Alabama

Alabama came into Lincoln ranked #2 as Nebraska was still feeling the sting of the loss to Washington State and a rare absence from the polls.  While the Crimson Tide slightly exceeded the Cornhuskers on offensive production, the 5-1 interception ratio and 25-17 first down edge each helped give Nebraska the edge to pull off the stunning upset.

Baylor

Baylor was behind 10-3 by the end of the 1st quarter, and their only other score was a 3rd-quarter touchdown made possible in part by a lost Nebraska fumble.  It was the offensive production that told the story of the day, as Nebraska rolled up 414 yards compared to the 182 produced by Baylor.

Indiana

Nebraska IB I.M. Hipp, starting place of injured IB Rick Berns, set a new single game rushing record of 254 yards, besting the previous record of 211 set the previous year by Berns.  Despite that performance, the game actually was in doubt entering the 4th quarter as the Hoosiers trailed 13–17, but the Cornhuskers added two more touchdowns soon after and came away with their 3rd consecutive 31-point score and win to close out the non-conference slate.

Kansas State

Two long touchdown runs by Nebraska IB I.M. Hipp created the gap between Kansas State and Nebraska, but the three interceptions suffered by the Wildcats also hurt any hopes that Kansas State may have had to put up a fight.  Though Nebraska started out behind 0–3 in the 1st quarter, they scored the next touchdown and never looked back.

Iowa State

Nebraska struck first and still held the 14–7 lead by the end of the 1st quarter, but two more Iowa State scores before the half put the Cyclones ahead for the rest of the game.  Both offenses ground to a halt in the 4th quarter as the Cornhuskers failed to overcome the 21–24 deficit and were handed their second loss of the season.

Colorado

The season of upsets for and against Nebraska continued, as the #7 Colorado team arrived in Lincoln to be dealt its first loss of the season.  One of the two Colorado scores came on a 98-yard kickoff return, but after the half it was all Nebraska as the Cornhuskers piled up 390 yards on the ground and 480 in total.

Oklahoma State

Nebraska owned the edge in all facets, leading 74-63 through the air and 318–196 on the ground.  Although the Cornhuskers didn't see the scoreboard until the 2nd quarter, they quickly took the lead with help from the Blackshirts, as the Cowboys soon found themselves too far behind to pose any further threat to Nebraska.

Missouri

Once again the Blackshirts helped carry the day to make up for repeated turnovers, along with help from Nebraska PK Billy Todd, who created some breathing room by accounting for 9 of the 11 points that separated the Cornhuskers from the Tigers at the final whistle.

Kansas

Nebraska steamrolled Kansas in Lincoln to close out the home schedule, setting records all over in the process.  Cornhusker PK Billy Todd set a new Nebraska record for field goals in a season with his 12th and tied a 55-yard longest Nebraska field goal record set in 1969, while the offense set a new single-game rushing record at 550 yards.  The Jayhawks' only score came in the 4th quarter against reserves.

Oklahoma

Both teams struggled to put points up to start out, but adjustments made by Oklahoma, with help from inopportune turnovers by Nebraska, led to a Sooner halftime lead of 21–7.  The Cornhuskers never were able to get consistent production after that and never saw the scoreboard again as Oklahoma had little trouble padding their lead by an additional 17 points to secure their 6th straight win over Nebraska.

North Carolina

Nebraska survived a scare when they came from behind, lagging North Carolina 7–17 at the start of the 4th quarter, to post two straight touchdowns for the lead and the win.  Nebraska was the only team to score more than 14 against the Tar Heels all year, as North Carolina led the nation in scoring defense and had held opponents to an average of under 8 points per game.  It was backup Nebraska QB Randy Garcia who provided the late spark for the Cornhuskers as he came off the bench and directed the two touchdown drives that put Nebraska ahead with just 3:16 left to play, putting away the game and closing the door on the Tar Heels' bid for an upset.

Rankings

Awards

NFL and Pro Players
The following Nebraska players who participated in the 1977 season later moved on to the next level and joined a professional or semi-pro team as draftees or free agents.

References

Nebraska
Nebraska Cornhuskers football seasons
Liberty Bowl champion seasons
Nebraska Cornhuskers football